Underground hydrogen storage is the practice of hydrogen storage in caverns, salt domes and depleted oil/gas fields. Large quantities of gaseous hydrogen have been stored in caverns for many years.   The storage of large quantities of hydrogen underground in solution-mined salt domes, aquifers, excavated rock caverns, or mines can function as grid energy storage, essential for the hydrogen economy. By using a turboexpander the electricity needs for compressed storage on 200 bar amounts to 2.1% of the energy content.

Chevron Phillips Clemens Terminal
The Chevron Phillips Clemens Terminal in Texas has stored hydrogen since the 1980s in a solution-mined salt cavern. The cavern roof is about  underground.

Development
Sandia National Laboratories released in 2011 a life-cycle cost analysis framework for geologic storage of hydrogen.
The European project Hyunder indicated in 2013 that for the storage of wind and solar energy an additional 85 caverns are required as it cannot be covered by pumped-storage hydroelectricity and compressed air energy storage systems.
 ETI released in 2015 a report The role of hydrogen storage in a clean responsive power system noting that the UK has sufficient salt bed resources to provide tens of GWe.
 RAG Austria AG finished a hydrogen storage project in a depleted oil and gas field in Austria in 2017, and is conducting its second project "Underground Sun Conversion".

A cavern sized 800 m tall and 50 m diameter can hold hydrogen equivalent to 150 GWh.

See also
Grid energy storage
Hydrogen infrastructure
Hydrogen economy
Hydrogen turboexpander-generator
Power to gas
Timeline of hydrogen technologies

References

External links
Hydrogen Supply Availability with Cavern Storage
Large Hydrogen Underground Storage
Wasserstoff-Speicherung in Salzkavernen zur Glättung des Windstromangebots (German)
1993-Energy and hydrogen Pag.48
2009-SNL-Geologic Storage of Hydrogen
Hydrogen stored in salt caverns could be converted into flexible power source archive

Sustainable technologies
Hydrogen storage